John McKenzie was a Scottish footballer who played as an inside right. He played in the Scottish Football League's top division for four clubs over nine consecutive seasons – Third Lanark, Heart of Midlothian, Aberdeen and Ayr United – before his career was curtailed by World War II.

His most notable achievement was appearing in the 1937 Scottish Cup Final which Aberdeen lost 2–1 to Celtic; the Dons were also runners-up in the 1936–37 Scottish Division One table behind Rangers, having been third behind the Old Firm teams the previous season – McKenzie missed only three matches across those two campaigns. In his single year with Hearts, they also finished third in the league table and lost out in the semi-finals of the 1934–35 Scottish Cup after a replay.

At representative level, he was selected for the Glasgow FA's annual challenge match against Sheffield in October 1933, scoring twice.

References

Year of birth unknown
Year of death unknown
Scottish footballers
Footballers from Glasgow
Association football inside forwards
Scottish Football League players
Scottish Junior Football Association players
Third Lanark A.C. players
Maryhill Hibernians F.C. players
Heart of Midlothian F.C. players
Aberdeen F.C. players
Ayr United F.C. players
St Anthony's F.C. players